Benjamin Jackson (January 2, 1835 – August 20, 1915) was a Nova Scotian who became a sailor, farmer, and decorated American Civil War soldier.

Early years 
Jackson was born at Lockhartville, Nova Scotia, a small village near Hantsport.  He married Rachel Cartier of Windsor, and together they had five children.  
When Jackson was a young man, Nova Scotia was experiencing a shipbuilding boom. At nearby Hantsport, a major shipbuilding centre and port, Jackson readily found work as a sailor aboard several vessels.

American Civil War 

In 1864 he sailed to the United States, during the Civil War. Jackson took the opportunity to fight for the Union Army by substituting for a Lewis Saunders (during the War individuals such as Saunders who were drafted into the army could pay to have a substitute go in their place.)  On May 21, 1864, Jackson enlisted in the US Navy and soon found himself aboard the  assigned as the captain of the #10 gun crew.  The Richmond was assigned to patrol and blockade the Mississippi River. Jackson took part in the Battle of Mobile Bay in August 1864. During the battle he retrieved a grenade that had landed on deck and threw it overboard before it could explode.  Mobile Bay was littered with torpedoes (during the Civil War a device similar to a contact mine) and Jackson disarmed a number of these which threatened Union vessels. Unfortunately one of the torpedoes exploded, wounding Jackson. After convalescing in hospital, Jackson was discharged on June 2, 1865.  He earned the Civil War Campaign Medal and was entitled to receive a pension from the US Government.  

Jackson returned to Nova Scotia, where he operated a small farm and went to sea again as a sailor aboard ships owned by Ezra Churchill of Hantsport.    

Jackson died on August 20, 1915, and was buried at Lockhartville, Nova Scotia, in an unmarked grave.

Legacy 

The Ben Jackson Road (exit 8A Highway 101) in Nova Scotia is named in his honour.    

On June 12, 2010, in a ceremony attended by approximately 400 people, including Civil War reenactment soldiers, Jackson's grave site was marked with a commemorative stone.

See also 
Military history of Nova Scotia
Canada in the American Civil War
Black Nova Scotians

References

Endnotes

Texts
 Richard M. Reid. African Canadians in Union Blue: Volunteering for the Cause in the Civil War

Links
  King’s County Advertiser/King’s County Register
  CBC News
 NovaNewsNow.com

1835 births
1915 deaths
People from Hants County, Nova Scotia
Union Army soldiers
Military history of Nova Scotia
Military history of Canada
Canadian people of the American Civil War